The women's 100 metres at the 1950 European Athletics Championships was held in Brussels, Belgium, at Heysel Stadium on 24 and 25 August 1950.

Medalists

Results

Final
25 August
Wind: 0.7 m/s

Heats
24 August

Heat 1
Wind: 0 m/s

Heat 2
Wind: 0.4 m/s

Heat 3
Wind: -1.9 m/s

Participation
According to an unofficial count, 15 athletes from 7 countries participated in the event.

 (2)
 (2)
 (1)
 (3)
 (3)
 (1)
 (3)

References

100 metres
100 metres at the European Athletics Championships
Euro